Islam uses a number of conventionally complimentary phrases praising Allah (e.g.), or wishing good things upon Muhammad or other prophets and chosen figures of God (e.g.).

Applied to God
After mentioning one of the names of God, such as Allah, an expression of worship is used as opposed to the phrases of supplication used for regular individuals. These include:

Applied to Muhammad and his family

In the above,  "upon him" may be replaced by  "upon him and upon his family."

Usually,  or "blessings" is used exclusively for Muhammad to distinguish between him and other prophets (and Imams in Shia Islam), but theoretically, it is used for all prophets equally.

Scriptural and hadith basis for prayers upon Muhammad

Qur'ān

The honorifics for Muhammad are enjoined by Surat al-Ahzab:

Ahadith

Ahmad ibn Hanbal reported in his  that the Companion of Muhammad, Abu Talha ibn Thabit, said:

Al-Bayhaqi reports that Abu Hurairah said that Muhammad said, "Send the Salaam on Allah's messengers and prophets for Allah sent them as He sent me."

This point is further founded in the saying by Muhammad, "The miser is the one in whose presence I am mentioned, then he does not send the Salam upon me."

Salafi ruling on abbreviating prayers upon Muhammad
Scholars of the Salafi branch of Islam practised in Saudi Arabia have instructed their followers not to abbreviate the  upon Muhammad. For example, Abd al-Aziz ibn Baz, the Grand Mufti of Saudi Arabia, said:

Applied to angels and prophets

Some honorifics apply to the archangels (Jibril, Mikhail, etc.) as well as any other Islamic prophets preceding Muhammad (Isa as, Musa as, Ibrahim as etc.). This fatwa was based on the ruling from Ibn Qayyim al-Jawziyya.


 Translation: "Peace be upon him"
 Abbreviation: "AS"
 
 Translation: "On him are the blessings and the peace of Allah"
 Abbreviation: "ASW"

Applied to companions of Muhammad 

Some honorifics are used after companions of Muḥammad:


Translation: "May Allāh be pleased with him"
Abbreviation: "RA"
Example: 

Translation: "May Allāh be pleased with her"
Example: 

Translation: "May Allāh be pleased with both of them"
Example: 

Translation: "May Allāh be pleased with them"
Example:

Applied to enemies of Muhammad 
Some honorifics are not used in the sense of "honoring" a person, and are instead used after the mention of the enemies of Muḥammad:


Translation: "May Allāh curse him"
Example:

Applied to scholars and saints

Some honorifics apply to highly revered scholars and people thought to be of high spiritual rank who have died:

/
Translation: "May Allah's mercy/ blessing be upon him"
Example: 
/
Translation: "May Allah's mercy/ blessing be upon her"
Example: 

Translation: "May Allah's mercy/ blessing be upon them"

If a revered scholar is still alive, the following is custom:

Translation: "May Allah preserve him"

Translation: "May Allah grant him relief"

Unicode

See also

References

 
Arabic words and phrases